No. 1310 Flight RAF is a flight of the Royal Air Force.

History
No. 1310 (Transport) Flight was first formed at RAF Llandow on 10 April 1944, equipped with Avro Anson I transport aircraft. The flight was disbanded on 21 July 1944 at RAF Bognor, absorbed by 83 Group Support Wing.

1310 Flight was re-formed at RAF Lyneham with Avro York transport aircraft to provide transport services for the early nuclear weapon tests in Western Australia, disbanding at RAAF Base Mallala on 7 December 1953.

The next incarnation of 1310 Flight was at RAF Odiham, where the Flight prepared to transfer to British Guiana, in South America, to assist the nascent government of the newly independent state. Its first role with helicopters flying Westland Whirlwind HAR 10s, with three helicopters, three pilots and approximately thirty ground crew, then deployed to Atkinson Field. This mission was carried out alongside five Alouette II helicopters of 24 Flt. Army Air Corps, in joint support of the British Army for two years before its helicopters were flown back to RAF Fairford with the Flight disbanding on 14 October 1966.

Following the Falklands War, the Flight was reformed at Kelly's Garden near to Port San Carlos, as 'ChinDet Falkland Islands', flying Boeing Chinook helicopters from Nos. 7 and 18 Squadrons, renamed as No. 1310 (Tactical Support) Flight RAF. Later 1310 Flt was amalgamated with 1564 Flt to form 78 Sqn at RAF Mount Pleasant.

1310 Flt was re-formed again at Split in Croatia in December 1995 for saw service in Bosnia, flying support for British units in the Implementation Force (IFOR) and Stabilisation Force (SFOR) until relieved by Chinooks of 298 Squadron RNLAF in December 2000.

It was again formed in southern Iraq to provide helicopter support to the British-commanded division based in the area and operated from a Main Operating Base at Basra Airport, and from a Forward Operating Base in Al Amarah on Operation Telic. It was stood down in April 2005 and replaced by 1419 Flt.

From 2005-2006, 1310 Flight operated Chinooks in Afghanistan's Helmand Province for Operation Herrick and Kandahar Province supporting the International Security Assistance Force (ISAF) on Operation Toral. The Chinook's role in Afghanistan included air assault, forward operating base resupply, and casualty evacuation.

The flight had eight Chinooks under its control. In November 2014 five of these were returned to the United Kingdom and the three remaining were moved to Kabul to support the personnel training the Afghan Armed Forces. 

Three Chinooks were based in Kabul until March 2015 and were replaced by Puma HC.2s.

From 2016-late 2017, 1310 Flight consisted of two Chinook HC.4s based in the Falkland Islands.

In 2018, three Chinooks and up to 100 support personnel were deployed to Mali in support of Operation Newcombe.

See also
RAF Mount Pleasant

References

Citations

Bibliography

Lake, Alan. "Flying Units of the RAF".Airlife Publishing. Shrewsbury. 1999. 

Royal Air Force independent flights
Military units and formations established in 1944